Sagda alligans is a species of air-breathing land snail, a terrestrial pulmonate gastropod mollusk in the family Sagdidae.

Shell description 
The shell is imperforate, globosely conoidal, white, under a brownish-yellow epidermis. The incremental striae are regular, stronger on the spire than on the body whorl. The number of whorls is 8. The shell has a narrow, aperture with a deep-seated strong basal lamella.

The adult shell diameter is 15–20 mm.

Distribution 
This species occurs in Jamaica.

References

External links 
 http://www.discoverlife.org/mp/20q?search=Sagda+alligans&guide=Molluscs
 https://web.archive.org/web/20081020150243/http://shell.kwansei.ac.jp/~shell/pic_book/data43/r004262.html

Sagdidae
Gastropods described in 1851